Giolitti is a surname. Notable people with the surname include:

 Alberto Giolitti (1923–1993), Italian artist
 Antonio Giolitti (1915–2010), Italian politician
 Florence Giolitti (born 1966), former French athlete
 Enrichetta Chiaraviglio-Giolitti, (1871-1959, daughter of Giovanni) Italian philanthropist and activist 
 Giovanni Giolitti (1842–1928), Italian politician, and prime minister of the Kingdom of Italy
Sheila Giolitti, American artist and art dealer

Italian-language surnames
it:Giolitti